Saluti e baci is a Franco-Italian comedy-drama film directed by Maurice Labro and Giorgio Simonelli and released in 1953.

Synopsis 
In a village in Italy, a radio presenter, Carlo Mastelli, loses his hearing, and passes the microphone to Marina, the young teacher, who suggests launching an appeal whereby all listeners send postcards from their country to Tonino, a young student in danger. Artists and celebrities, mostly from Italy and France, take part in the appeal, and a number respond, which at the same time boosts the show's ratings, and brings great happiness to Carlo.

Commentary 
Saluti e baci or Love and Kisses, is a film which deals with charity appeals a long time before the humanitarian appeals of Band Aid or Chanteurs Sans Frontières of the 1980s. In the film, a group of singers get together en masse to help those less fortunate than themselves, something which would later be seen in the Enfoirés who formed Les Restos du Cœur.

Details

Starring

External links 

1953 films
1950s musical comedy-drama films
French musical comedy-drama films
French black-and-white films
Films directed by Giorgio Simonelli
Films directed by Maurice Labro
Italian musical comedy-drama films
1953 comedy films
1953 drama films
Italian black-and-white films
1950s Italian films
1950s French films